Carposina scirrhosella, the peach fruit moth,  is a moth of the Carposinidae family. It is found from Germany, Austria, the Czech Republic and Slovakia, Hungary, Serbia, Romania and Bulgaria to the Middle East.

The wingspan is 11–15 mm. The forewings are whitish. The hindwings are whitish in males and somewhat darkened in females. Adults are on wing from June to August.

The larvae feed on Rosa species. They feed inside the fruit of their host plant. They eject small frass packages which can be found on the exterior of the rose hip.

References

Moths described in 1854
Carposinidae
Moths of Europe
Moths of Asia